Symplocos costata is a species of plant in the family Symplocaceae. It is endemic to Sumatra. It is a vulnerable species threatened by habitat loss.

References

costata
Endemic flora of Sumatra
Vulnerable plants
Taxonomy articles created by Polbot
Taxa named by Carl Ludwig Blume
Taxa named by Jacques Denys Choisy
Taxa named by Heinrich Zollinger